Ilyas Khoja (died 1368) was Khan in Transoxiana (1363) and Khan of Moghulistan from 1363 to 1368. He was the son of Tughlugh Timur.

Biography
In 1363, Tughlugh Timur, who had recently taken control of Transoxiana and had executed many of its local leaders, appointed Ilyas Khoja as its ruler. The ruthlessness with which the Moghuls ruled the region caused many to oppose them, including  of the Qara'unas and Amir Timur of the Barlas.

In 1365, Ilyas Khoja returned to Transoxiana. In May, he defeated Amir Husayn and Timur at the battle of Tashkent, but when he arrived before the gates of Samarkand its inhabitants refused to let him enter, and the subsequent siege was disastrous. A plague among the horses deprived the Moghuls of their power, and they were forced to leave Transoxiana again.

In 1368, Ilyas Khoja died. The Dughlat amir Qamar ud-Din then usurped the khanship; he was probably responsible for Ilyas Khoja's death. Much of the khan's family was murdered, but his brother Khizr Khoja, who would eventually regain Moghulistan for the line of Chagatai Khan, was safely hidden.

References 

1368 deaths
Mongol Empire Muslims
14th-century monarchs in Asia
Year of birth unknown
Turkic rulers
Chagatai khans